Stromatopelma is a genus of African tarantulas that was first described by Ferdinand Anton Franz Karsch in 1881. They are renowned for their potent venom that uses stromatoxin peptides to induce medically significant effects.

Species
 it contains five species and one subspecies, found in Africa:
Stromatopelma batesi (Pocock, 1902) – Cameroon, Congo
Stromatopelma calceatum (Fabricius, 1793) (type) – West Africa
Stromatopelma c. griseipes (Pocock, 1897) – West Africa
Stromatopelma fumigatum (Pocock, 1900) – Equatorial Guinea (Mbini)
Stromatopelma pachypoda (Strand, 1908) – Cameroon
Stromatopelma satanas (Berland, 1917) – Gabon, Congo

In synonymy:
Stromatopelma alicapillatum Karsch, 1881 = Stromatopelma calceatum 
Stromatopelma aussereri (Becker, 1879) = Stromatopelma calceatum
Stromatopelma brachypoda (Pocock, 1897) = Stromatopelma calceatum
Stromatopelma horrida (Thorell, 1899) = Stromatopelma calceatum
Stromatopelma straeleni (Roewer, 1953) = Stromatopelma batesi

See also
 List of Theraphosidae species

References

External links
 Tarantupedia

Theraphosidae genera
Spiders of Africa
Theraphosidae